Sofia Zoo in Sofia, the capital of Bulgaria, was founded by royal decree on 1 May 1888, and is the oldest and largest zoological garden in Southeast Europe.

History 

Initially, the zoo was located in the park of the former royal palace, with the primary attraction being a Eurasian black vulture caught in Bulgaria and exhibited in a cage in the garden. Later, pheasants and deer were added to the collection, but since the exhibits and facilities of the time proved inadequate to accommodate a pair of brown bears, Tsar Ferdinand of Bulgaria ordered a grant of land to be awarded to Sofia Zoo on the grounds of the former botanical garden, then in the outskirts of the city.

Sofia Zoo's exhibition of animals constantly increased, with both local and foreign species being added, most notably a pair of lions in 1892, which were housed in a former stable and a lion cub was born the same year.

Between 1893 and 1895, new cages and buildings were constructed to accommodate the ever-increasing collection of birds and mammals, including a solid three-room stone building in the back of the terrain designed to be inhabited by bears (1894), a pool where a few pink-backed pelicans lived, a building to accommodate pheasants and another one for eagles (1895).

Exhibits 
 Grazing animals
The zoo has some 80 individuals representing 20 grazing species, including white rhinos,  hippopotamus, elephant, zebras, red deer, ibex, wild boar, dromedary camels, and American bison.

 Primates
Primates are housed in two pavilions. The zoo has 93 individuals representing 19 species, including ring-tailed lemurs, yellow baboons, common marmoset, and macaques.

 Predators
The predator sector houses big cats, bears and small predators, including lions, tigers, leopards, pumas and brown bears.

 Penguins
In January 2011 the zoo received eight Humboldt penguins on loan from Germany. The penguins were on loan for about 18 months. Afterward they were returned, with any offspring staying at the zoo.

 Birds
The zoo has some 1,400 individual birds representing 192 species. Waterbirds are housed in a  lake, and Imperial eagles, Griffon vultures, Egyptian vultures and buzzards in a large walk-through aviary. Other species of birds at the zoo include ostriches, Silver pheasants, peacocks, flamingos, blue-and-yellow macaws, owls, cockatoos and cockatiels.

Other facilities 
The zoo's veterinary clinic includes a separate entrance and is accessible to the public without entry to the zoo.

The future 
Sofia Zoo is currently in the process of upgrading its facilities to meet current European standards in preparation for becoming a full member of the European Association of Zoos and Aquaria (EAZA).

Incidents 
In 2009, the central heating at the zoo was shut down because the gas supply into the country was stopped by Russia due to a pricing dispute. About a third of the 1,300 animals at the zoo were vulnerable to the resulting cold and employees had to find portable electric and oil heaters to heat their enclosures.

Gallery

Notes

External links 

 

Parks in Sofia
Buildings and structures in Sofia
Zoos in Bulgaria
Tourist attractions in Sofia
1888 establishments in Bulgaria
Zoos established in 1888
Education in Sofia